Peter Corless is a game designer who has worked primarily on role-playing games.

Early life
Peter Corless was born in New York City in 1964.

Career
Peter Corless has been part of the gaming industry since the 1980s, first employed at West End Games, where he worked on various projects, from Paranoia to the Star Wars Roleplaying Game and Star Warriors board game. Corless gained the rights to Pendragon - including the fiction line - from Chaosium in 1998 as the result of a loan he had made to Chaosium that was defaulted upon. Using money he made from his regular job at Cisco, Corless created the company Green Knight Publishing to publish the Pendragon fiction and RPG lines. Corless received three roleplaying products and two books of fiction that had been in progress; the book of fiction Arthur, the Bear of Britain (1998) was ready to go to press and had only been delayed because of cashflow problems at Chaosium, and thus Green Knight was able to get it to print almost immediately, while To the Chapel Perilous (1999), the other fiction book, followed the next year. By 1999, Corless had Green Knight fully running and he was able to publish the three RPG supplements originally intended for publication by Chaosium: two adventure books by Shannon Appelcline, Tales of Chivalry and Romance (1999) and Tales of Magic and Miracles (1999), and one background book, Roderick Robertson's Saxons (2000) . While a few different editors held the position of line editor at various times, Corless eventually became the line editor for Pendragon as a result of financial problems. In 1999, Corless brought James Lowder in to oversee the Pendragon fiction line for Green Knight. Printers, artists, and authors were owed money by Chaosium for Pendragon work, and although Green Knight was under no actual obligation to resolve these old debts, in many cases Corless chose to. After a series of events caused financial problems for the company Green Knight was unable to continue publishing, so Corless first made sure his freelancers were taken care of, and then sold the rights and remaining stock of the Pendragon RPG to White Wolf Publishing in 2004, and remaindered the Pendragon fiction stock to Paizo Publishing in 2005.

Corless lives in Mountain View, California.

References

External links
Homepage of Peter Corless
 Peter Corless :: Pen & Paper RPG Database archive

Living people
Role-playing game designers
Year of birth missing (living people)